The Company of Ringers of the Blessed Virgin Mary of Lincoln ring the bells of Lincoln Cathedral. It practises the English style of change ringing.

History
The Blessed Virgin Mary of Lincoln Company of Ringers is the oldest ringing society with a continuous history of ringing and was formally instigated on 18 October 1612 under a statute granted by the Dean of Lincoln. The Company were also granted their own chapel, still known today as The Ringers' Chapel.

In 2011 a theatrical event to celebrate the history of the company was staged as part of the Lincoln Arts Festival, using acrobats to portray the physicality of ringing.

See also 
Change Ringing
Society of Cambridge Youths

References

External links 
 The Company of Ringers - Lincoln The Company's own website 

1612 establishments in England
Bell ringing societies in England
Culture in Lincolnshire
Lincoln Cathedral